Harifin Tumpa was the twelfth Chief Justice of the Supreme Court of Indonesia as well as the first Deputy Chief Justice of the Supreme Court Indonesia for non-judicial affairs.

Tumpa's retirement led to a measure of controversy surrounding the Supreme Court of Indonesia, as rumors of vote buying by his more junior colleagues abounded before he'd even officially retired.

References

Chief justices of the Supreme Court of Indonesia
21st-century Indonesian judges
1942 births
Living people